Shavar McIntosh (born November 13, 1997) is a young actor.

He made his Broadway debut in The Lion King as Simba, a role he is currently portraying.  He is from Harlem, New York City.

References

External links

playbill.com
The Lion King Official Website

1997 births
Living people
American male stage actors
American male child actors